Biathlon at the 2015 Winter Universiade was held in Osrblie from January 25 to January 31, 2015.

Men's events

Women's events

Mixed events

Medal table

External links
Biathlon results at the 2015 Winter Universiade.
Results book

 
Biathlon
2015
Universiade
Biathlon competitions in Slovakia
Winter Universiade